Nikki or Nicki Turner may refer to:

Nikki Turner (author), American author
Nicki Turner (cricketer) (born 1959), New Zealand cricketer
Nikki Turner (public health advocate), New Zealand scientist